The Jefferson Fire Station is located in Jefferson, Wisconsin.

History
The building has been converted from its original use and is occupied by a number of businesses. It was listed on the National Register of Historic Places in 1984 and on the State Register of Historic Places in 1989.

References

Fire stations on the National Register of Historic Places in Wisconsin
Commercial buildings on the National Register of Historic Places in Wisconsin
National Register of Historic Places in Jefferson County, Wisconsin
Italianate architecture in Wisconsin
Brick buildings and structures
Industrial buildings completed in 1871
1871 establishments in Wisconsin